The Cosmos Copa, originally called Copa NYC, was an amateur adult soccer tournament played in New York City between teams representing different ethnic heritages in a World Cup-style competition.

History 

The competition was founded in 2009 by local soccer fans Spencer Dormitzer and Chris Noble.  In 2010, the newly-established New York Cosmos took over the tournament, which continued to be run by its founders. The Copa was renamed for the professional club as part of the deal.

The tournament was "postponed" in 2016 and has not been held since.

Format 

In its most recent format, thirty-two teams competed in the Cosmos Copa.  Teams were made up of amateur players over 18 years old and living in the Tri-State area, representing their national heritage; every player must either be from, or have parents who are from, the country they represent. 

The format began with a round robin Group Stage, followed by a Round of 16, Quarterfinals, Semifinals and a Championship match.

Winners 
2009: NYC Albania
2010: NYC Poland
2011: NYC Poland
2012: NYC Haiti
2013: NYC France
2014: NYC Gambia
2015: NYC Ireland

References

External links 
CosmosCopa.com

See also 

 New York Cosmos

Soccer competitions in the United States
New York Cosmos
2009 establishments in New York City
Recurring sporting events established in 2009